Kahlenberg may refer to: 

Kahlenberg, a mountain
Kahlenberg (surname)